Killa Wañunan (Quechua killa moon, wañuy to die, -na a suffix, "where the moon dies", -n a suffix, Hispanicized spelling Quillahuañunan) is a  mountain in the Andes of Peru. It lies in the Junín Region, Yauli Province, Yauli District. Killa  Wañunan is situated southeast of the Antikuna mountain pass and the lake named Waqraqucha, east of Tuku Mach'ay.

References

Mountains of Peru
Mountains of Junín Region